Bugsy is a 1991 American biographical crime drama film directed by Barry Levinson and written by James Toback. The film stars Warren Beatty, Annette Bening, Harvey Keitel, Ben Kingsley, Elliott Gould, Bebe Neuwirth, and Joe Mantegna. It is based on the life of American mobster Bugsy Siegel and his relationship with wife and starlet Virginia Hill.

Bugsy was given a limited released by TriStar Pictures on December 13, 1991, followed by a theatrical wide release on December 20, 1991. It received generally positive reviews from critics and was a minor box office hit, grossing $49.1 million on a $30 million budget. It received ten nominations at the 64th Academy Awards (including for Best Picture and Best Director) and won two: Best Art Direction and Best Costume Design. It won the Golden Globe Award for Best Motion Picture - Drama.

Plot
In 1941, gangster Benjamin "Bugsy" Siegel, who had partnered in crime since childhood  with Meyer Lansky and Charlie Luciano, goes to Los Angeles and instantly falls in love with Virginia Hill, a tough-talking Hollywood starlet. The two meet for the first time when Bugsy visits actor George Raft on the set of Manpower. He buys a house in Beverly Hills, planning to stay there while his wife and two daughters remain in Scarsdale, New York.

Bugsy is in California to wrestle control of betting parlors away from weak Los Angeles crime family boss Jack Dragna. Ascending local Jewish gangster Mickey Cohen robs Dragna's operation one day. He is confronted by Bugsy, who decides he should be in business with the guy who committed the robbery, not the guy who got robbed. Cohen is put in charge of the betting casinos; Dragna is forced to confess  to a raging Bugsy that he stole $14,000 and is told he now answers to Cohen.

After arguments about Virginia's trysts with drummer Gene Krupa and various bullfighters and Bugsy's reluctance to get a divorce, Virginia makes a romantic move on Bugsy. On a trip to Nevada to make a maintenance call to a rough gambling joint, Bugsy is struck with the inspiration for a luxury hotel and casino in the desert of Nevada, which happens to be in the only state where gambling is legal. He obtains $1 million in funding from Lansky and other New York City mobsters, on the motion of going big doing it legit in Nevada. Virginia wants no part of it until Bugsy offers her a share, puts her in charge of accounting and begins constructing the Flamingo Las Vegas Hotel Casino in Las Vegas; however, the budget soon soars out of control to $6 million due to his extravagance. Bugsy tries everything to ensure it gets completed, even selling his share of the casino.

Bugsy is visited in Los Angeles by former associate Harry Greenberg, who has betrayed his old associates to save himself and run out of money from a combination of his gambling habits and being extorted by prosecutors who want his testimony. Though he is Harry's trusted friend, Bugsy has no choice but to kill him. He is arrested for the murder, but the only witness is a cab driver who dropped Harry off in front of Bugsy's  house. The driver is paid to leave town.

Lansky waits for Bugsy outside the jail and gives a satchel of money to his friend, though warns that he will no longer be able to protect Bugsy. The Flamingo's opening night is a total failure in a rainstorm, and $2 million of the budget is unaccounted for. Bugsy discovers that Virginia stole the money, which he then lets her keep. He then urges Lansky never to sell his share of the casino because he will live to thank him someday.

Later that night, Bugsy is shot and killed in his home. Virginia is told the news in Las Vegas and knows her own days could be numbered.

The end title cards state that one week after Bugsy's death, Virginia returned all of the missing money to Lansky and later committed suicide in Austria, and by 1991, the $6 million invested in Bugsy's Las Vegas dream had generated revenues of $100 billion.

Cast
 Warren Beatty as Ben "Bugsy" Siegel
 Annette Bening as Virginia Hill
 Harvey Keitel as Mickey Cohen
 Ben Kingsley as Meyer Lansky
 Elliott Gould as Harry Greenberg
 Joe Mantegna as George Raft
 Bebe Neuwirth as Countess Dorothy di Frasso
 Bill Graham as Charlie Luciano
 Lewis Van Bergen as Joe Adonis
 Wendy Phillips as Esta Siegel, Bugsy's first wife
 Richard C. Sarafian as Jack Dragna
 Carmine Caridi as Frank Costello
 Andy Romano as Del Webb, general contractor for The Flamingo
 Wendie Malick as Inez Malick
 Stefanie Mason as Millicent Siegel, Bugsy's elder daughter
 Kimberly McCullough as Barbara Siegel, Bugsy's younger daughter
 Don Calfa as Louie Dragna, Jack Dragna's nephew and cohort 
 Ray McKinnon as David Hinton, architectural designer of the Flamingo
 Joe Baker as Lawrence Tibbett, a famed opera singer whose house Bugsy buys
 Ksenia Prohaska as Marlene Dietrich, George Raft's co-star in Manpower
 Gian-Carlo Scandiuzzi as Count di Frasso, an Italian aristocrat and personal friend of Benito Mussolini
 Joseph Roman and James Toback as Moe Sedway and Gus Greenbaum, the mobsters who take control of The Flamingo after Bugsy's murder

Other cast members in smaller roles include Robert Glaudini as Dominic Manzella, Jack Dragna's hatchet man; Eric Christmas as Ronald the butler, Robert Beltran as Alejandro, Don Carrara as Vito Genovese, Bryan Smith as Chick Hill, Virginia's brother; Traci Lind as Natalie St. Clair, and Debrah Farentino and Wendie Malick as two of Bugsy's one-night stands.

Production
Beatty's desire to make and star in a film about Bugsy Siegel can be traced all the way back to the late 1970s and early 1980s. After completing Reds, Beatty had several projects that he wanted to do but his two dream projects were to produce, star, and possibly direct the life story of Howard Hughes and the life story of Bugsy. Beatty stated that of all the characters he played in films, such as Clyde Barrow in Bonnie and Clyde and John Reed in Reds, he felt that he was the right actor to play both Bugsy and Hughes.

Beatty was fascinated by Siegel, who he thought was a strange emblem of America (an American gangster who was the son of Jewish immigrants who became fascinated with Hollywood and who also envisioned a desert city in which legal gambling is allowed). Several filmmakers attempted to make a film based on Bugsy's life, most famously French director Jean-Luc Godard, who wrote a script entitled The Story and envisioned Robert De Niro as Siegel and Diane Keaton as Virginia Hill.
In the late 1970s, Beatty met screenwriter James Toback, with whom he became fast friends when Beatty was preparing Heaven Can Wait. Years later, when Beatty was in pre-production on Ishtar, he asked Toback to write a script on Bugsy.

During the course of six years and in between two films that he was involved in, Toback wrote a 400-page document of Bugsy's life. However, under some strange circumstances, Toback lost the entire document. Under pressure from Warner Bros., who Beatty learned also had a Bugsy Siegel script ready to be produced, Beatty pursued Toback to write a script based on his lost document. Toback handed his new script to Beatty. Beatty approved it and went to several studios in hopes of obtaining financing and distribution for the film. Beatty presented Toback's script to Warner Bros. and claimed that it was much better than the one that Warner Bros. was interested in producing. Warner Bros. passed on the project, and Beatty eventually got the backing of TriStar Pictures.

Initially, Toback was under the impression that he would be the director. For a while, Beatty could not find a director (he did not know or chose not to know of Toback's desire to direct the film). Beatty feared that he would be stuck in the position of having to direct the film himself. He said, "I'm in just about every scene of the picture, and I didn't want to have to do all that other work." However, Beatty announced to Toback that Barry Levinson was on board to direct Bugsy. At first, Toback was disappointed, but he quickly learned that Levinson was the right person for the job. Despite the length of the script (which would have run three and a half to four hours), Beatty, Levinson, and Toback condensed it to a two-and-a-half to three-hour script. The trio worked very closely together during the production of the film.

During casting, Beatty wanted Annette Bening to play the role of Virginia Hill. Before Bugsy, Bening was a candidate to play Tess Trueheart in Beatty's Dick Tracy. After seeing her audition, Beatty phoned Levinson and told him, "She's terrific. I love her. I'm going to marry her". Levinson thought Beatty was just excited at her audition and did not think that Beatty actually meant what he had said. Both Beatty and Bening stated that their relationship started after completing the film. Later that summer, Bening became pregnant with her and Beatty's first child, which resulted in a tabloid/media frenzy at the time. The child was born January 8, 1992, and the couple married on March 12.

Originally, Beatty played Bugsy with a heavy New York City accent (which can be heard in the trailer). However, both Levinson and Toback thought that the accent was not right, so Beatty dropped the accent (which he thought was "charming") and used his normal voice.

Principal photography began in January 1991, and filming wrapped in May 1991. Portions of the film were shot in the Coachella Valley, California.

Release 
Bugsy had a limited release on December 13, 1991, and was released nationwide on December 20, 1991.  A director's cut was released on DVD, containing an additional 13 minutes not seen in the theatrical version.

Reception 

On Rotten Tomatoes the film has a rating of 84% based on 61 reviews. The site's critical consensus reads, "Stylishly scattered, Bugsy offers cinematic homage to the infamous underworld legend, chiefly through a magnetic performance from Warren Beatty in the title role." Metacritic gave the film a score of 80 based on 27 reviews, indicating "generally favorable reviews". Film critic Roger Ebert gave the film four of four stars, saying "Bugsy moves with a lightness that belies its strength. It is a movie that vibrates with optimism and passion, with the exuberance of the con-man on his game."

Accolades

The film is recognized by American Film Institute in these lists:
 2003: AFI's 100 Years...100 Heroes & Villains:
 Bugsy Siegel – Nominated Villain
 2005: AFI's 100 Years...100 Movie Quotes:
 Virginia Hill: "Why don't you go outside and jerk yourself a soda?" – Nominated
 2008: AFI's 10 Top 10:
 Nominated Gangster Film

See also
 List of films set in Las Vegas

References

External links
 
 
 

1991 films
1991 crime drama films
1990s biographical drama films
American crime drama films
American biographical drama films
1990s English-language films
Biographical films about gangsters
Cultural depictions of Bugsy Siegel
Cultural depictions of Lucky Luciano
Cultural depictions of Meyer Lansky
Cultural depictions of Joe Adonis
Cultural depictions of Frank Costello
Films about gambling
Films about the American Mafia
Films about Jewish-American organized crime
Films directed by Barry Levinson
Best Drama Picture Golden Globe winners
Films scored by Ennio Morricone
Films set in the Las Vegas Valley
Films set in Los Angeles
Films set in the 1940s
Films shot in California
Films that won the Best Costume Design Academy Award
Films whose art director won the Best Art Direction Academy Award
TriStar Pictures films
Films produced by Warren Beatty
American films based on actual events
Mafia films
American gangster films
1990s American films